Compulsions is a drama web series which debuted Dec 01, 2009 on Dailymotion.com.  The show stars Craig Frank as Mark Sandler, an admitted Sadist leading a life with a dull desk job, alongside Justine Davis as Janna Bossier, Mark's friend and handler, and Annemarie Pazmino as Cassandra Morrissey.

Premise 
The series is the internal character story of Mark Sandler (Craig Frank), an admitted Sadist leading a life with a dull desk job. At night, he channels his inner compulsions as a professional interrogator, brutally and psychological extracting bits of crucial information from his "clients". Mark's one true friend and handler is Justine Davies (Janna Bossier) a compulsive Trophy Hunter and ruthless Retrieval Specialist who feeds Mark's compulsions with fresh interrogation subjects. Mark's world is threatened with the introduction of compulsive voyeur Cassandra Morrissey (Annemarie Pazmino).

Characters
Mark Sandler - Played by Craig Frank
Justine Davis - Played by Janna Bossier
Cassandra Morrissey - Played by Annemarie Pazmino

Awards

Won
2010 Streamy Awards – Best Writing for a Drama Web Series (Bernie Su)

Nominated
2010 Streamy Awards – Best Drama Web Series, Best Directing for a Drama Web Series (Nathan Atkinson), Best Male Actor in a Drama Web Series (Craig Frank)

References

External links
 Official website of Compulsions
 YouTube Compulsions
 Compulsions on Blip
 Compulsions on Facebook
 Compulsions on Twitter

2009 web series debuts
2010 web series endings
American drama web series
2000s YouTube series
2010s YouTube series
Streamy Award-winning channels, series or shows